Bruce Alan Fields (born October 6, 1960) is an American former professional baseball outfielder and the former hitting coach of the Cleveland Indians of Major League Baseball (MLB). He played during three seasons at the MLB for the Detroit Tigers and Seattle Mariners.

Career
Fields was drafted by the Tigers in the 7th round of the 1978 MLB draft. He played his first professional season with their Rookie league Bristol Tigers in 1978, and split his last season between the Atlanta Braves' Triple-A club, the Richmond Braves, and the Toronto Blue Jays' Triple-A team, the Syracuse Chiefs, in 1991.

From 1997 through 2000, Fields was manager of the Class A West Michigan Whitecaps, leading them in 2000 to the league's best record and winning the Midwest League Manager of the Year Award twice (1997 and 2000).  He managed the Triple-A Toledo Mud Hens for two seasons, before serving as hitting coach for the Detroit Tigers from 2003 to 2005. Fields took over as hitting coach for the Cleveland Indians on June 19, 2011.

Personal life
Fields is the father of Detroit Tiger Daniel Fields, who played in his first major league game on June 4, 2015, against the Oakland Athletics. Fields' older son, Aaron, a former minor league prospect in the Cleveland Indians' system, was in attendance.

Fields was a basketball teammate of Magic Johnson at Everett High School (Michigan) in Lansing, Michigan, starting on the school's 1977 Class A Michigan High School Athletic Association championship team.

External links

Pura Pelota (Venezuelan Winter League)

1960 births
Living people
African-American baseball coaches
African-American baseball managers
African-American baseball players
American expatriate baseball players in Canada
Baseball coaches from Ohio
Baseball players from Cleveland
Birmingham Barons players
Bristol Tigers players
Calgary Cannons players
Cleveland Indians coaches
Detroit Tigers coaches
Detroit Tigers players
Lakeland Tigers players
Macon Peaches players
Major League Baseball hitting coaches
Major League Baseball outfielders
Nashville Sounds players
Richmond Braves players
San Jose Bees players
Seattle Mariners players
Syracuse Chiefs players
Tacoma Tigers players
Tiburones de La Guaira players
American expatriate baseball players in Venezuela
Toledo Mud Hens managers
Toledo Mud Hens players
21st-century African-American people
20th-century African-American sportspeople